Denys Alan Turner (born 5 August 1942) is a British-born American philosopher and theologian. He is Horace Tracy Pitkin Professor of Historical Theology emeritus at Yale University having been appointed in 2005, previously having been Norris–Hulse Professor of Divinity at the University of Cambridge. He earned his Doctor of Philosophy degree in philosophy from the University of Oxford. He has written widely on political theory and social theory in relation to Christian theology, as well as on medieval thought, in particular, mystical theology and Christian mysticism.

Prior to his position at Cambridge, he was Professor of Theology and Head of Department at the University of Birmingham and has also held Head of Department at the University of Bristol. Turner also worked at University College Dublin and Manhattanville College, New York. He is currently a visiting professor at Princeton University.

Turner has three children: Ruth, John, and Brendan.

Bibliography

Books 
 On the Philosophy of Karl Marx, Dublin: Sceptre (1968), pp. 93. 
 Marxism and Christianity, Oxford: Blackwell (1983), pp. 256. Paperback edn. 1984. 
 Eros and Allegory, Kalamazoo: Cistercian Publications (1995), pp. vi + 471. 
 The Darkness of God: Negativity in Christian Mysticism, Cambridge: Cambridge University Press (1995), pp. xi + 278. Paperback edition published September, 1998. Fourth impression, November, 1999. Electronic edition, 2002. 
 Faith Seeking, London: SCM (2002), pp.xiii + 146. 
 Faith, Reason, and the Existence of God, Cambridge: Cambridge University Press (2004), pp. xix + 271.
 Julian of Norwich, Theologian, New Haven: Yale University Press (2011), pp. 304. . .
 Thomas Aquinas: A Portrait, New Haven: Yale University Press (2013)

Articles
Can a Christian be a Marxist https://www.jstor.org/stable/43246378 June 1975. New Blackfriars.

Critical studies and reviews of Turner's work
God, Mystery, and Mystification

See also
 Slant (journal)

References

External links
Denys Turner - Yale Univ. faculty profile

1942 births
20th-century English philosophers
20th-century British Roman Catholic theologians
21st-century English philosophers
21st-century British Roman Catholic theologians
Academics of the University of Birmingham
Academics of the University of Bristol
Academics of University College Dublin
Alumni of St Edmund Hall, Oxford
British expatriate academics in the United States
Catholic philosophers
Catholic socialists
Catholicism and far-left politics
Christian socialist theologians
English Christian socialists
English Marxists
Fellows of Peterhouse, Cambridge
Living people
Manhattanville College faculty
Marxist writers
Mysticism scholars
Opus Dei members
Yale University faculty
Norris–Hulse Professors of Divinity
New Blackfriars people